Caveat (March 16, 1980 – February 21, 1995) was an American Thoroughbred racehorse.

Background
Bred in Maryland by Ryehill Farm, he was sired by Kentucky Derby winner Cannonade out of The Axe II mare Cold Hearted. To date, Caveat is one of  eleven Maryland-bred colts to win a Triple Crown race.

Caveat was owned by the partnership of August Belmont IV, Robert Kirkham, and his breeder, James P. Ryan. He was conditioned for racing by U.S. Racing Hall of Fame trainer Woody Stephens.

Racing career
As a two-year-old, Caveat placed second in the Grade II Lane's End Breeders' Futurity Stakes with Eddie Maple aboard.

At age three, Caveat won the Prince John Stakes and came in second in the Arkansas Derby three weeks prior to the Derby. Woody Stephens felt like he needed a little tightening up, so he ran Caveat six days before the Derby and won the Derby Trial.  Then in May, he placed third in the Kentucky Derby behind Sunny's Halo. Five weeks later, under jockey Laffit Pincay, Jr., he won the Belmont Stakes against a record field of 15 horses, straining a ligament in his right foreleg at the top of the stretch in the process.  The injury was the cause of his eventual retirement.

Retirement
Caveat was retired in August, 1983, and syndicated as a stallion.  Among his progeny, he was the sire of Arlington Million winner Awad, Timely Warning, Cefis, Warning Glance, Ratings, and Ops Smile.

As a broodmare sire, he sired Beware of the Cat, dam of Belmont Stakes winner Editor's Note.

Caveat died in February, 1995, at Northview Stallion Station in Maryland and is buried in Windfields Farm Equine Cemetery at Northview Stallion Station.

Pedigree

References

1980 racehorse births
1995 racehorse deaths
Racehorses bred in Maryland
Racehorses trained in the United States
Belmont Stakes winners
Belmont family
Thoroughbred family 3-n